Dickkopf-related protein 4 is a protein in the Dickkopf family that in humans is encoded by the DKK4 gene.

In cats

In 2021, researchers at the Stanford University School of Medicine discovered that the gene, located on chromosome B1 of the cat genome, is responsible for patterns on cats. During embryonic development, the epidermis develops alternating thick and thin (in terms of depth, not width) regions, previously found to match the striped mackerel or blotchy patterns that would be expressed based on mutations in the embryos' Transmembrane aminopeptidase Q (Taqpep) gene. The genes DKK4 and Wingless Inhibitory Factor 1 (WIF1) both secrete Wnt signaling inhibitors, but in cells where both are upregulated, DKK4 produces much more of its protein than WIF1. In DKK4-positive cells, both Wnt signaling inhibitor and activator genes are upregulated, but inhibitor genes like DKK4 secrete proteins with a larger area of effect. DKK4 expression creates a molecular pre-pattern where the thick epidermal regions will develop, then gradually reduces as the embryo continues to develop. In embryos with the blotchy Taqpep mutation, DKK4 was expressed less and in a broader pattern compared to embryos with the mackerel pattern version of the gene.

DKK4 was also examined in specifically Abyssinian cats, which are known for their “ticked” fur with bands of colors on each hair. Two variants, or alleles, of DKK4, p.Ala18Val and p.Cys63Tyr, were discovered in cats with obscured tabby markings. In some other breeds and non-breeds of cats, the presence of p.Ala18Val also correlated with the Ticked phenotype, while other variants correlated with the Non-Ticked phenotype. These variants caused loss of function of the DKK4 gene and smaller, more tightly packed dark areas.

References